Hanau Nord station is a railway station in the municipality of Hanau, located in the Main-Kinzig-Kreis in Hesse, Germany.

References

Nord
Buildings and structures in Main-Kinzig-Kreis